Klubi i Futbollit Besa is a professional Albanian football club based in Kavajë. It is currently competing in Kategoria e Parë, the 2nd tier of Albanian football. They play their home games at Besa Stadium.

History

Early years (1925–1944)
Klubi Sportiv Besa was founded on 25 October 1925 originally as "Shoqata Kulturore-Sportive Adriatiku" which was a multi-disciplinary sports club based in Kavajë, Albania. In 1930, the club changed its name to "Sport Klub Kavajë".
That same year the football team played its first ever friendly at Mali i Robit, Golem against an amateur team formed of students from the Albanian-American Institute of Agriculture. A short time later, SK Kavajë joined the newly formed Albanian Football Association and participated in the 1930 second tier championship where they would repeat their participation for the next two seasons before joining the top tier Kategoria e Parë in 1933. In their first top flight championship SK Kavajë finished last in the 5 team league, losing 7 games and winning just one, a 2–1 victory over local rivals Teuta Durrës.

In 1935, the club took the shape of an organized one under the leadership of chairman Irfan Berati. The vice-chairman was Fehmi Kazazi, the secretary was Dervish Cara, the committee members were Sulejman Karkini and Reshat Asllani, the cashier was Rasim Sulejmani and Dhori Fora was in charge of the trade of craft. The following year, the club was renamed "Besa Kavajë" also known as "Besa Sport Klub", derived from the name Besa, the Albanian cultural precept meaning "to keep the promise" and "word of honor".

During World War II, many members of the club lost their lives as soldiers, including Mehmet Babamusta, Adil Alushi, Sami Karriqi and Millan Radosalja. The activities of the club became very limited and support came primarily from the local residents of the city. There were no official competitions held in Albania at this time.

Rise (1945–1965)
But between 1945 and 1950, the club experienced a revival which was due to young talented players coming through the ranks of the youth teams, including the likes of Qamil Teliti who went on to receive national success. During the 1945–46 season, the club won the unofficial Sports Federation President's Cup. Many of the club's players during the late 1940s would go on to play for the Albania national team, including Qamil Teliti, who scored the winning goal against Romania that won Albania the 1946 Balkan Cup.

In 1958, the club achieved a second-place finish in the top tier Albanian Championship, narrowly losing out to Partizani Tirana for the title by one point. Also during the 1958 season, they reached the semi final of the Albanian Cup, again losing out to eventual winners Partizani Tirana. The club would go on to reach the finals of the Albanian Cup in 1961, losing to Partizani Tirana once again and also the following season in 1962–63, where they lost on penalties to KF Tirana. In 1963, Besa won the unofficial cup competition held by the 'Sport' newspaper, and in 1965 it won the 'Bashkimi' newspaper competition.

Golden generation (1965–1975)
The period between 1965 and 1975 has been called the golden generation of football in Kavajë, due to the domestic achievements especially in the Albanian Cup which resulted in the club's first ever European games. In 1971, they finished as runners-up in the Albanian Cup after losing 2–0 in the finals to Dinamo Tirana. They repeated this feat the following year, losing on penalties in the cup final following a 2–2 draw with Vllaznia Shkodër, but as Vllaznia also won the league in that same year, this gave Besa the opportunity to participate in the UEFA Cup Winners' Cup in the 1972–73 season.

Their first European opponents were Danish side, Fremad Amager, who Besa managed to overcome on away goals following a 1–1 draw away in Copenhagen and a goalless draw at home. In the next round however they were beaten by Scottish side Hibernian, whom they lost to on aggregate 8–2, following a 7–1 away loss and a 1–1 draw at home. The end of the golden generation era was marked with the completion of the club's first purpose built stadium, Besa Stadium. Construction was completed in 1974 and the new stadium had a capacity to seat 9,000 spectators.

Recent years
Besa confirmed their place in the 2007–08 UEFA Cup after a 3–2 win against neighbours KS Teuta in the 2006–07 Albanian Cup final. They met Bežanija of Serbia in the first qualifying round, drawing 2–2 away and 0–0 at home to progress on away goals. In the second qualifying round, they fell 3–0 in each leg to Bulgarian side Litex Lovech. In 2008, they qualified for the Intertoto Cup due to their third-place finish in the league, drawing Ethnikos Achna 0–0 at home and 1–1 in Cyprus and continued on away goals. In the 2nd round of the Intertoto cup they were eliminated by Grasshopper Zürich from Switzerland.

Besa in European competitions
As of October 2015

 1QR = 1st Qualifying Round
 2QR = 2nd Qualifying Round
 1R  = 1st Round
 2R  = 2nd Round
 3R  = 3rd Round

Current squad

Historical list of coaches

 Rexhep Spahiu (1960-1971)
 Muhamet Vila (1971-1973)
 Fatmir Frashëri (1981-1982)
 Dashnor Bajaziti (1985–1988)
 Bajram Hushi (1990–1991)
 Fisnik Kosova (1992–1993)
 Zihni Gjinali (1994)
 Fisnik Kosova (1994)
 Haki Arkaxhiu (1995)
 Azem Mullaliu (1995–1996)
 Artan Lilamani (1996)
 Bujar Pagria (1997)
 Edmond Gëzdari (1997–1998)
 Naim Hushi (1998)
 Shkëlqim Muça (1998–1999)
 Ilir Gjyla (1999–2000)
 Ramadan Shehu (2001)
 Faruk Sejdini (2001)
 Edmond Gëzdari (2001)
 Haxhi Arkaxhiu (2002)
 Ramadan Shehu (2002)
 Abdyl Kuriu (2002)
 Ramadan Shehu (2002)
 Astrit Sejdini (2003)
 Ilir Gjyla (2003)
 Ilir Duro (4 Jan 2005 – 28 Aug 2005)
 Agim Canaj (28 Aug 2005 – 3 Dec 2005)
 Ilir Shulku (3 Dec 2005 – 05 Apr 2006)
 Përparim Daiu (05 Apr 2006 – 30 Jun 2006)
 Hasan Lika (Jul 2006 – 25 Sep 2006)
 Përparim Daiu (25 Sep 2006 – 20 Nov 2006)
 Vasil Bici (20 Nov 2006 – 14 May 2007)
 Ylli Teliti (14 May 2007 – Jun 2007)
 Silviu Dumitrescu (Jul 2007 – 29 Nov 2007)
 Iljaz Haxhiaj (29 Nov 2007 – 3 Dec Jun 2007)
 Sulejman Starova (3 Dec 2007 – 6 Apr 2008)
 Iljaz Haxhiaj (6 Apr 2008 – 16 Sep 2008)
 Ilir Daja (16 Sep 2008 – 22 Feb 2009)
 Ilir Biturku (22 Feb 2009 - Jun 2009)
 Shpëtim Duro (Jul 2009 - 20 Sep 2010)
 Përparim Daiu (20 Sep 2010 – 3 Nov 2010)
 Gerd Haxhiu (3 Nov 2010 – Jun 2011)
 Gugash Magani (Jul 2011 – Jun 2012)
 Ilir Daja (Jul 2012 - Feb 2013)
 Përparim Daiu (Feb 2013 – May 2013)
 Ramadan Shehu (Jul 2013 – Aug 2013)
 Artan Mërgjyshi (Aug 2013 - 14 Nov 2014)
 Bledar Sinella (14 Nov 2014 - Apr 2015)
 Dorjan Bubeqi (Apr 2015 – Nov 2015)
 Ilir Gjyla (Mar 2016 - May 2016)
 Bekim Kuli  (28 Jul 2016 – ?)
 Ndriçim Kashami (Sep 2016 – Oct 2016)
 Julian Ahmataj (Oct 2016 – May 2017)
 Artion Poçi (Aug 2017 – Sep 2017)
 Bledar Sinella (Sep 2017 - May 2018)
 Gentian Begeja (26 Jun 2018 - Dec 2018)
 Gugash Magani (Jan 2019 – Feb 2020 )
 Ndricim Kashami (Feb 2020 – Nov 2020)
 Artan Mërgjyshi (Nov 2020 - Apr 2021)
 Ndricim Kashami (Apr 2021 – Oct 2021)
 Dorjan Bubeqi (Oct 2021 – May 2022)
 Gugash Magani (Jun 2022 – )

Honours
Kategoria Superiore
Runners-up (2): 1958, 2009–10
3rd Place (11): 1936, 1937, 1945, 1962–63, 1963–64, 1966–67, 1972–73, 1973–74, 1978–79, 1992–93, 2007–08

Kategoria e Parë
Winners (4): 1932, 1977–78, 1985–86, 2004–05
Runners-up (2): 1999–00, 2001–02

Albanian Cup
Winners (2): 2007, 2010
Runners-up (6): 1961, 1963, 1971, 1972, 1982, 1992

Albanian Supercup
Winners (1): 2010

Records
 Biggest Victories: 9–1 vs Ismail Qemali (1937); 12–0 vs Bashkimi Elbasanas (1945); 7–0 vs Shkumbini (17.02.1963); 11–0 vs Apolonia Fier (1965); 8–1 vs Poliçani (28.08.1991); 7–1 vs Tirana (1992)
 Biggest Defeats: 1–9 vs Skënderbeu (16.04.1933); 0–6 vs Partizani (09.02.1975); 1–7 vs Tirana (12.09.2003)
 Most points in a season: 56 (2007–08)
 Fewest points in a season: 1 (1948)
 Most ties in a season: 14 (1973–74, 1976–77, 1989–90)
 Fewest ties in a season: 0 (1933)
 Most losses in a season: 23 (2003–04)
 Fewest losses in a season: 3 (1958)
 Best Goal Differential: +27 (1937)
 Worst Goal Differential: -43 (2003–04)

Sponsors

Official Kit Sponsor: PORTA KAVALJA
Official Sponsor: BASHKIA KAVAJË

See also
 Golemi FC
 Luzi United
 FK Egnatia

References

External links
Besa at UEFA.COM
Besa at FIFA.COM

Football clubs in Kavajë
Football clubs in Albania
Association football clubs established in 1925
1925 establishments in Albania